Lilly Daché ( 1892 – 31 December 1989) was a French-born American milliner and fashion merchandiser. She started her career in a small bonnet shop, advanced to being a sales lady at Macy's department store, and from there started her own hat business. She was at the peak of her business career in the 1930s and 1940s. Her contributions to millinery were well-known custom-designed fashion hats for wealthy women, celebrities, socialites, and movie stars. Her hats cost about ten times the average cost of a lady's hat. Her main hat business was in New York City with branches in Paris. Later in her career she expanded her fashion line to include dresses, perfume, and jewelry.

Early life and immigration
Daché was born at Bègles, France, in 1892. Her father was a French Catholic farmer and her mother was a style-conscious woman; Daché was the oldest of five children. The names of her parents or siblings are unknown. Her childhood consisted of exploring Paris with her mother and following her father around their farm in Begles. Daché left school when she was fourteen and learned hatmaking basics under her aunt's tutoring in Bordeaux, France. Her aunt saw that she had a natural ability in this field since she could make hats out of scrap fabric so she sent young Dache to work for the best-known Parisian milliners of the time ― Suzanne Talbot, Caroline Reboux, and Georgette Berger. They taught her most everything needed in the art of millinery, from making small invisible stitches, to making a crown form of the head hair for draping a turban onto, to putting a rose on a hat so it looked like it grew there.

Daché immigrated to the United States in 1924, arriving in Hoboken on September 13. She had $13 to her name upon arrival in the United States and got her first job as a designer for Darlington's in Philadelphia. She soon thereafter moved to New York City and got a job at the Bonnet Shop, a small milliner hat shop at 2190 Broadway. Desiring higher pay, she quit that job and took on a job at Macy's department store in their lady's hat area. She held the saleslady position for six weeks and then resigned, returning to the Bonnet Shop and worked with her friend Hattie Fredericks. One day the shop owner announced she was going to sell the business. Daché and her co-associate friend bought the business for $1000 with a $200 down payment and a promissory note for the remainder of $800. Daché bought out her friend's share within a year and owned the entire business.

Career 
Daché's contributions to millinery were wrapped around turbans, custom-fitted hats, brimmed half hats, hat caps with visors, cone-tipped berets, loose-fitting colored hairnets, and decorative flower-shaped hats. Daché first developed her made-on-the-head hats starting with Follies showgirls in 1926. She said that glamour made a man ask for the wearer's telephone number and it also made a woman ask for the name of the wearer's tailor. Her business flourished in spite of the Great Depression and World War II. Her hats cost upwards of $20 to $80 at a time when a decent hat could be bought for just a tenth of that.

In 1937, Daché moved her entire millinery business to a nine-story New York City building at 78 East 56th Street called the House of Dache. Here she made her retail sales directly to customers, a wholesale trade to middle management, a workroom, and a penthouse residence. The clothing designer Halston and the hair stylist Kenneth were her employees for awhile and then went into business for themselves. Daché's yearly production of custom headgear was estimated as high as 9,000 hats a year. She worked with Hollywood costume designer Travis Banton by providing his movie stars like Gloria Swanson, Carmen Miranda, Bette Davis, and Betty Grable with the needed fashion hats to complement their costumes. She also provided hats for Joan Crawford, Marlene Dietrich, Marion Davies, Gertrude Lawrence, Sonja Henie, Audrey Hepburn, and Carole Lombard.

Daché in 1940 received a special award from Neiman-Marcus for her design of a hat for Lord and Taylor. In 1943 she received the Coty American Fashion Critics' special award in millinery. She was known for designing custom clothing with matching cloche hats and swagger hats beginning in 1948.  By 1949 she was designing and making lady's complimentary clothing, dresses, lingerie, accessories, perfumes, cosmetics, and jewelry. She had business branches for these products in Paris. Her Lilly Dache label became synonymous with elegance. During the late 1950s lady's fashion hats were no longer popular, so during this time Dache went into the beauty salon business. She was president of Lilly Dache' Hair Products and in 1956 wrote a book titled Lilly Dache's Glamour Book. She was not as successful at this as she was in her hat business and closed her doors on all business ventures by 1969, retiring when her husband retired.

Personal life 
In 1931, Daché married French-born Jean Despres who was an executive at the large cosmetics and fragrance company, Coty, Inc. Together they raised one daughter, Suzanne. Dache retired in 1968 and at that time sold her last thirty hats to actress Loretta Young. She died on December 31, 1989, at a nursing facility in Louveciennes, France, at the age of 97. In the last twenty years of her life she had divided her time between Paris and Delray Beach, Florida. She also spent time in New York City and Meudon, France.

Dache became a celebrity when she was a guest on a 1955 episode of the television game show What's My Line?. Panelist Arlene Francis guessed her mystery identity. She is referenced in the song "Tangerine" performed by the Jimmy Dorsey orchestra as the female singer sings in the second course that Tangerine is all they speak of with darkened eyelashes and a fashion hat by Dache. Daché said that she had made more fashion hats than any other woman in the world. Some of her custom hats are displayed at New York's Metropolitan Museum.

Works 
Talking Through My Hats (1946)
Glamour Book (1956)

Awards 
 Neiman Marcus Fashion Award (1940)
 Coty American Fashion Critics Award (1943)

References

Sources 

American milliners
French fashion designers
French women fashion designers
1890s births
1989 deaths
American fashion designers
American women fashion designers
French emigrants to the United States
20th-century American businesswomen
20th-century American businesspeople